Kenneth Edgar Wormald is an American dancer, reality television star and actor. His best known role to date is perhaps as Ren McCormack in the 2011 remake of 1984's Footloose. Wormald was a regular on the MTV reality television series Dancelife in 2007.

Early life
Wormald was born in Boston, the son of Melanie and Edgar K. Wormald, and grew up in Stoughton, Massachusetts, where he graduated from Stoughton High School in 2002. He has two brothers, Lee and Dylan. He moved to Los Angeles right after his high school graduation.

Acting career 
In January 2004, Wormald starred as a dancer in the movie You Got Served. In April 2008 Wormald was confirmed to make his Acting debut in the Oxygen cable network Made-For-Television film Center Stage: Turn It Up as the male lead. The film, a sequel to Center Stage, premiered in November that same year.

In June 2010, Paramount Pictures announced Wormald was cast as the protagonist in the planned remake of the 1984 dance drama film Footloose. Both Zac Efron and Chace Crawford were attached to play the role of Ren McCormack but both dropped out. Filming took place in September that same year on a $24 million budget with Julianne Hough and Dennis Quaid confirmed to star. The film Footloose was released on October 14, 2011 to generally positive reviews from critics with Wormald's performance receiving mixed reviews. The film went on to gross over $62 million worldwide.

In 2012, Wormald starred in mock reality webseries Massholes. In 2013, Wormald had main role as Topher in the movie Kid Cannabis. He also played the role of Pete in the movie Cavemen. In 2014, Wormald starred as Gordan in the movie The Living. Wormald had a role as Vito Tortano in the film By The Gun, directed by James Mottern. He also played the role of Ray in the movie Lap Dance.

In 2015, Wormald starred in the short film Instagram: A Caption Story, which was released on YouTube on February 3, 2015. Also that year, Wormald played the role of Dennis Wilson in the indie movie Love & Mercy. He also starred as Chris in the horror film The Girl in the Photographs. He appeared in the music video for Mike Stud's song After Hours, which Wormald also directed.

In 2016, Wormald reprises his role as Tommy Anderson in Center Stage: On Pointe, which premiered on June 25, 2016 on Lifetime. He guest starred as Derek in Fear the Walking Dead. He starred as Erik Wildwood in the direct to video dance film Honey 3: Dare to Dance alongside Cassie Ventura. In 2017, Wormald played the role of Junior Burnside in the indie horror film Happy Hunting. He also played the role of Travis in the indie drama film High Low Forty.

Dance career
He began dancing at the age of six, after his mother saw him dancing to a New Kids on the Block video. At age 13, he won the Master Dance of New England and was named the Junior Mr. Dance of New England. A year later, at age 14, he was named Teen Dancer of Boston.

At age 15, he was named Teen Mr. Dance of New England. In 1996, Wormald was selected to dance for President Bill Clinton at the White House as part of the annual Easter celebration. In 2002, he won the gold medal at the World Dance Championships in Riesa, Germany for a tap dance routine he performed.

Wormald has appeared in music videos for Madonna, Mariah Carey, Chris Brown, Christina Aguilera, Nelly Furtado, BoA and JoJo. Wormald has been a back-up dancer for both Justin Timberlake and The Pussycat Dolls tours.

In December 2006, Wormald was announced to have joined the MTV Jennifer Lopez-produced dance-oriented reality television series Dancelife which follows a group of aspiring dancers trying to make it in Hollywood. Notably the series starred So You Think You Can Dance Canada choreographer Blake McGrath. The series was not renewed for a second season due to low ratings.

Tours 
 Justin Timberlake – FutureSex/LoveShow (2007)
 The Pussycat Dolls – Doll Domination Tour (2009)

Filmography

References

Further reading 
 Fahey, Rich, "Stoughton dancer leaps to starring role", The Boston Globe, January 2, 2011
 Soroff, Jonathan, "Kenny Wormald: The new Footloose star tells us about dancers’ feet, L.A. girls and tripping in front of Madonna", The Improper Bostonian, October 19 - November 1, 2011 issue, p. 35.
 Woodman, Tenley, "Kicking it old-school: Stoughton dancer says accent helped him land ‘Footloose’", The Boston Herald, Wednesday, October 12, 2011

External links
 
 
 

Male actors from Boston
American choreographers
American male dancers
American male film actors
Living people
People from Stoughton, Massachusetts
21st-century American male actors
Artists from Boston